Paddy Keenan (born 1 October 1984) is a  Gaelic footballer from County Louth, Ireland. He played for the Louth senior inter-county football team and for his club St Patrick's Lordship.

Education
Keenan is a graduate of DCU where he obtained an MSC in Business Management and played for DCU in the 2008 Sigerson Cup.

All Star
In October 2010, Keenan was named in the 2010 All Stars football team at midfield for his performances for Louth during the 2010 season.

2010 Leinster Football Championship Final
He played and scored a point in the 2010 Leinster Football Final defeat to Meath where they appeared to be on their way to a first title since 1957 before losing to a late goal.l

He helped Louth to win both Tommy Murphy Cup and National League Division 2 tiles in 2006.

Keenan is Louth's first ever All Star winner since the scheme began in 1971, meaning only Carlow and Longford have never won an All Star in either code. Keenan was part of the team that won Louth the NFL Division 3 title in 2011.

Leinster and Ireland
Paddy represented his Province, 
Leinster, with fellow club and county player Dessie Finnegan. In 2010 he also represented his country in the International Rules against Australia on a number of occasions.

St Patrick's
At club level he has won 7 Louth Senior Football Championships with St Patrick's Lordship in 2003, 2004, 2007, 2011, 2012 2014 & 2015. He captained 'The Pats' in 2007 to win their 3rd ever Louth SFC title in Louth beating local rivals Cooley Kickhams.

Retirement
He retired from inter-county football at the age of 29 in 2014.

Honours
 6 Louth Senior Football Championship 2003 2004 2007 2011 2012 & 2014 2015
 1 All Star 2010
 1 National Football League Division 3 2011
 1 National Football League Division 2 2006
 1 Tommy Murphy Cup 2006
 1 McGeough Cup 2011
 1 Vodafone Player Of The Month June 2010
 GAA Player of the Week, 20 May 2014 after his superior performance against West Meath. 
 Captained Louth until retirement.
 5 Cardinal O'Connell's 
1 Sheelan Cup

References

1984 births
Living people
Alumni of Dublin City University
DCU Gaelic footballers
Louth inter-county Gaelic footballers
St Patrick's Lordship footballers